Hmeimim or Humaymim is a Syrian village in the Jableh District in Latakia Governorate. According to the Syria Central Bureau of Statistics (CBS), Hmeimim had a population of 3,701 in the 2004 census.

The region hosts the Russian operated Khmeimim Air Base.

References

Alawite communities in Syria
Populated places in Jableh District